The Sotto Mayor Palace is a Portuguese palace located in Lisbon.

History 
The Sotto Mayor Palace was built for Candido Sotto Mayor, a Portuguese aristocrat, industrialist, founder of Banco Sotto Mayor and the richest man in Portugal at the time, to serve as his residence in the new avenues being built in late 19th century Lisbon.

In 1988, Sotto Mayor Palace was made a property of public interest by IPPAR.

After a fire in the palace, the Lisbon Municipal Chamber and IPPAR formalized and put into action a plan for re-qualification and remodeling of the palace. These plans called for an annex on the side of the palace, while only minor changes to the palace itself. These re-qualifications prepared the palace for its new function as a commercial center and as location of the Colombian embassy in Portugal.

Sources 
 
 
 

Palaces in Lisbon